Markaj is an Albanian surname, derived from the given name Mark. Notable people with the surname include:

Denis Markaj (born 1991), Kosovar footballer of Swiss–Albanian descent
Mario Markaj (born 1995), Albanian football midfielder

Albanian-language surnames
Patronymic surnames
Surnames from given names